"All I Want Is Everything" is a 1996 song by the English hard rock band Def Leppard from their album Slang. The song reached #38 on the U.K. Singles Chart and has not been played live by the band since the Slang World Tour in 1997.

Background
In reference to the song, lead singer Elliot said in the album's commentary that "All I Want Is Everything" was "demoed as almost a country song, [the song] went through a lot of changes in the studio." Elliot also says that the song has "almost a U2 feel to it", and the "very solemn" lyrics sum up "a lot of what the band was going through at the time: births, deaths, divorces."

Music video
The music video was directed by Matt Mahurin and shot at "Studios & Location", USA in August 1996. The video was released in September 1996.

Track listing

CD: Bludgeon Riffola - Mercury / LepDD17 (UK) / 578 539-2 
This version includes "Strictly Limited Edition Collector's Postcards". It contains the Slang, Retroactive, Adrenalize and Vault postcards, with the band members comments on the back of each one.

 "All I Want Is Everything"
 "'Cause We Ended as Lovers"
 "Led Boots"
 "All I Want Is Everything" (edit)

CD: Bludgeon Riffola - Mercury / 314 578 548-2 / USA 
 "All I Want Is Everything"
 "Move With Me Slowly"

CD: Bludgeon Riffola - Mercury / LEPCD 17 / 578 537-2 
 "All I Want Is Everything"
 "When Saturday Comes"
 "Jimmy's Theme"
 "All I Want Is Everything" (edit)

Charts

References

Def Leppard songs
1996 singles
Songs written by Joe Elliott
1996 songs